Events from the year 1797 in Sweden

Incumbents
 Monarch – Gustav IV Adolf

Events

 31 October - The wedding between King Gustav IV Adolf and Frederica of Baden.

Births
 4 July- Jacquette Löwenhielm, royal mistress (died 1839)
 15 July - Kloka Anna, cunning woman and medium (died 1860)
 10 September – Karl Gustaf Mosander, chemist  (died 1858)
 28 September – Sophie von Knorring, writer (died 1848)
 Anna Göransdotter, textile artist (died 1867)

Deaths

 - Christina Elisabeth Carowsky, painter  (born 1745)
 - Brita Sophia De la Gardie, actress and socialite  (born 1713)

References

 
Years of the 18th century in Sweden
Sweden